Band-e Zarak (also known as Bandark-e Kohneh, Banz̄ark, Banz̄ark-e Kohneh, Banz̄ark Kohneh, and Banz̄ark Now) is a village in Band-e Zarak Rural District, in the Central District of Minab County, Hormozgan Province, Iran. At the 2006 census, its population was 4,386, in 776 families.

References 

Populated places in Minab County